The right to exist is said to be an attribute of nations. According to an essay by the 19th-century French philosopher Ernest Renan, a state has the right to exist when individuals are willing to sacrifice their own interests for the community it represents. Unlike self-determination, the right to exist is an attribute of states rather than of peoples. It is not a right recognized in international law. The phrase has featured prominently in the Arab–Israeli conflict since the 1950s.

The right to exist of a de facto state may be balanced against another state's right to territorial integrity. Proponents of the right to exist trace it back to the "right of existence", said to be a fundamental right of states recognized by writers on international law for hundreds of years.

Historical use
Thomas Paine (1737–1809) used the phrase "right to exist" to refer to forms of government, arguing that representative government has a right to exist, but that hereditary government does not. In 1823, Sir Walter Scott argued for the "right to exist in the Greek people". (The Greeks were then revolting against Turkish rule.) According to Renan's "What is a Nation?" (1882), "So long as this moral consciousness [called a nation] gives proof of its strength by the sacrifices which demand the abdication of the individual to the advantage of the community, it is legitimate and has the right to exist. If doubts arise regarding its frontiers, consult the populations in the areas under dispute." Existence is not a historical right, but "a daily plebiscite, just as an individual's existence is a perpetual affirmation of life," Renan said. The phrase gained enormous usage in reference to the breakup of the Ottoman Empire in 1918. "If Turkey has a right to exist – and the Powers are very prompt to assert that she has – she possesses an equally good right to defend herself against all attempts to imperil her political existence," wrote Eliakim and Robert Littell in 1903. In many cases, a nation's right to exist is not questioned, and is therefore not asserted.

Examples

Armenia
The right to exist of Armenia became known as the Armenian question during the Congress of Berlin in 1878, and would again be asked during the Armenian genocide in World War I.

Basque nation

According to Basque nationalists, "Euzkadi (the name of our country in our own language) is the country of the Basques with as such right to exist independently as a nation as Poland or Ireland. The Basques are a very ancient people..."

Israel/Palestine
In 1947, a United Nations General Assembly resolution provided for the creation of an "Arab State" and a "Jewish State" to exist within Palestine in the United Nations Partition Plan for Palestine. The Jewish Agency, precursor to the Israeli government, agreed to the plan, but the Palestinians rejected it and fighting broke out. After Israel's 14 May 1948 unilateral declaration of independence, support from neighboring Arab states escalated the 1947–48 Civil War in Mandatory Palestine into the 1948 Arab-Israeli War. The legal and territorial status of Israel and Palestine is still hotly disputed in the region and within the international community.

According to Ilan Pappé, Arab recognition of Israel's right to exist was part of Folke Bernadotte's 1948 peace plan. The Arab states gave this as their reason to reject the plan. In the 1950s UK MP Herbert Morrison cited then Egyptian President Gamal Abdel Nasser as saying "Israel is an artificial State which must disappear." The issue was described as the central one between Israel and the Arabs.

After the June 1967 war, Egyptian spokesman Mohammed H. el-Zayyat stated that Cairo had accepted Israel's right to exist since the signing of the Egyptian-Israeli armistice in 1949. He added that this did not imply recognition of Israel. In September, the Arab leaders adopted a hardline "three nos" position in the Khartoum Resolution: No peace with Israel, no recognition of Israel, and no negotiations with Israel. But In November, Egypt accepted UN Security Council Resolution 242, which implied acceptance of Israel's right to exist. At the same time, Nasser urged Yasser Arafat and other Palestinian leaders to reject the resolution. "You must be our irresponsible arm," he said. King Hussein of Jordan also acknowledged that Israel had a right to exist at this time. Meanwhile, Syria rejected Resolution 242, saying that it, "refers to Israel's right to exist and it ignores the right of the [Palestinian] refugees to return to their homes."

Upon assuming the premiership in 1977, Menachem Begin spoke as follows:
Our right to exist—have you ever heard of such a thing? Would it enter the mind of any Briton or Frenchman, Belgian or Dutchman, Hungarian or Bulgarian, Russian or American, to request for its people recognition of its right to exist? ... Mr. Speaker: From the Knesset of Israel, I say to the world, our very existence per se is our right to exist!

As reported by The New York Times, in 1988 Yasser Arafat declared that the Palestinians accepted United Nations Security Council Resolutions 242 and 338, which would guarantee "the right to exist in peace and security for all". In June 2009, US president Barack Obama said "Israelis must acknowledge that just as Israel's right to exist cannot be denied, neither can Palestine's."

In 1993, there was an official exchange of letters between Israeli Prime Minister Yitzhak Rabin and chairman Arafat, in which Arafat declared that "the PLO affirms that those articles of the Palestinian Covenant which deny Israel's right to exist, and the provisions of the Covenant which are inconsistent with the commitments of this letter are now inoperative and no longer valid."

In 2009 Prime Minister Ehud Olmert demanded the Palestinian Authority's acceptance of Israel's right to exist as a Jewish state, which the Palestinian Authority rejected. The Knesset plenum gave initial approval in May 2009 to a bill criminalising the public denial of Israel's right to exist as a Jewish state, with a penalty of up to a year in prison. In 2011 Palestinian President Mahmoud Abbas said in a speech to the Dutch Parliament that the Palestinian people recognise Israel's right to exist and they hope the Israeli government will respond by "recognizing the Palestinian state on the borders of the land occupied in 1967."

Israeli government ministers Naftali Bennett and Danny Danon have repeatedly rejected the creation of a Palestinian state, with Bennett stating "I will do everything in my power to make sure they never get a state." In June 2016 a poll showed that only 4 out of 20 Israeli ministers accepted the state of Palestine's right to exist.

John V. Whitbeck argued that Israel's insistence on a right to exist forces Palestinians to provide a moral justification for their own suffering. Noam Chomsky has argued that no state has the right to exist, that the concept was invented in the 1970s, and that Israel's right to exist cannot be accepted by the Palestinians.

International law scholar Anthony Carty observed in 2013 that "the question whether Israel has a legal right to exist might appear to be one of the most emotively charged in the vocabulary of international law and politics. It evokes immediately the ‘exterminationist’ rhetoric of numerous Arab and Islamic politicians and ideologues, not least the present President of Iran."

Kashmir
Representatives of the Kashmiri people regularly assert their right to exist as a nation, independent from both India and Pakistan.

Kurdistan
Representatives of the Kurdish people regularly assert their right to exist as a nation.

Northern Ireland
The 1937 Constitution of Ireland originally claimed the national territory consisted of the whole of the island in Articles 2 and 3, denying Northern Ireland's right to exist. These articles were changed such that the previous claim over the whole island of Ireland became instead an aspiration towards creating a united Ireland by peaceful means, "with the consent of a majority of the people, democratically expressed, in both jurisdictions in the island" as part of the Good Friday Agreement ending The Troubles, a violent conflict between Irish nationalists and Ulster unionists from 1969 to 1998. The Good Friday signatories "recognise the legitimacy of whatever choice is freely exercised by a majority of the people of Northern Ireland with regard to its status, whether they prefer to continue to support the Union with Great Britain or a sovereign united Ireland."

North Korea
In the context of South Korea's and the United States non-recognition of the North Korean state and what the North views as a 'hostile policy' pursued by the US, the North's government frequently accuses the US of denying the 'right of existence' of North Korea. For instance, a 2017 Foreign Ministry statement declared, "The DPRK will redouble the efforts to increase its strength to safeguard the country’s sovereignty and right to existence." North Korea itself does not recognise the right of existence of the Republic of Korea in the south.

Ukraine
In 2021, a year prior to the 2022 Russian invasion of Ukraine, Russian president Vladimir Putin published the text "On the Historical Unity of Russians and Ukrainians." The essay claims that Belarusians, Ukrainians and Russians are "one people" that foreign powers wanted to "divide and rule." Putin links the movements for the creation of independent Ukrainian states in the early 20th century to machinations of the Central Powers of World War I and Axis Powers of World War II to weaken the Russian Empire and the Soviet Union, respectively. RBK Daily claimed the essay is required reading for the Russian military. Former president Petro Poroshenko compared the essay to Hitler's Sudetenland speech. 35 legal and genocide experts denounced the essay, claiming it "[lays] the groundwork for incitement to genocide" by "denying the existence" of Ukrainians as a people.

Citations
1791 Thomas Paine, Rights of Man: "The fact therefore must be that the individuals themselves, each in his own personal and sovereign right, entered into a contract with each other to produce a government: and this is the only mode in which governments have a right to arise, and the only principle on which they have a right to exist."
1823 Sir Walter Scott: "Admitting, however, this right to exist in the Greek people, it is a different question whether there is any right, much more any call, for the nations of Europe to interfere in their support."
1882 Ernest Renan, "What is a nation?": So long as this moral consciousness gives proof of its strength by the sacrifices which demand the abdication of the individual to the advantage of the community, it is legitimate and has the right to exist [French: le droit d'exister].
1916 American Institute of International Law: "Every nation has the right to exist, and to protect and to conserve its existence."
1933 Nazis all over Germany checking if people had voted on withdrawal from the League of Nations said "We do this because Germany's right to exist is now a question of to be or not to be."

See also

References

Notes

Further reading 
 Yaacov Lozowick: Right to Exist: A Moral Defense of Israel's Wars. Doubleday, 2003. 
 Sholom Aleichem. Why Do the Jews Need a Land of Their own?, 1898

External links 
 Does Israel have a right to exist?
 Israel's Right to the Land, a presentation by U.S. Senator James Inhofe (R-Oklahoma)
 From the father of Daniel Pearl

Independence movements
International law
Nation
Political science terminology
Secession
Exist
Sovereignty